The Wanderer W21 was a middle-class six-cylinder sedan introduced by Auto Union's Wanderer company in  1933. The W21 replaced the Wanderer W17, from which it inherited its ohv engine. The car shared its chassis with the more powerful Wanderer W22, but its engine was smaller.

Two years after introduction, in 1935, the car was renamed as the Wanderer W235, and in 1936 it was renamed again as the Wanderer W35. The engine and principal mechanical components remained very little changed throughout, however, as did the wheelbase and other principal chassis measurements. The car therefore was, and generally still is, regarded as a single model despite the name changes.

At  launch the W21 differed from its predecessor most notably on account of its subframe and swing rear axle, supported by lateral leaf springing, adopting a pattern established by Professor Porsche during his time with the (at that time still independent) Austrian Steyr company. Another new feature in the W21 was the hydraulic braking system.

The car was powered by a six-cylinder four-stroke ohv  engine of 1690 cc driving the rear wheels via a four-speed gear box.

Initially the compact-six-engined Wanderer was offered as a four-door saloon and as a two-door cabriolet. The 1935 name change from W21 to W235 coincided with the withdrawal of the cabriolet version and the introduction of a four-door ‘tourer’. There were no significant changes to the car accompanying the 1936 name change to Wanderer W35.

The Wanderer W21/W235/W35 shared its  wheelbase both with the six-cylinder 1950 cc W22/W240/W40 and, after 1935, with the six-cylinder 2257 cc W245/W250/W45/W50 models. Taking all the 3 meter wheelbase models together, 29,111 of these six-cylinder Wanderers were produced between 1933 and 1938.

Arguably Auto Union did not directly replace the Wanderer W35. However, the four-cylinder Wanderer W24 with its 42 PS (31 kW) engine was probably seen by some to be occupying the same middle market sector.

References

W21
Sedans
Cars introduced in 1933
1930s cars
Auto Union
Rear-wheel-drive vehicles